Uuvudhiya Constituency is an electoral constituency in the Oshana Region of Namibia. It has 4,357 inhabitants, its district capital is the settlement of Uuvudhiya. The constituency had 2,869 registered voters as of 2004.

Geography
The constituency is by far the largest in Oshana region. The area is dominated by flood plains which become swamps during the raining season.

Economy and infrastructure
The district road D3607 is the access road to Uuvudhiya constituency. There are no other proclaimed roads in the constituency; Transport is done on tracks that frequently become impassable during the raining season.

Politics
Uuvudhiya constituency is traditionally a stronghold of the South West Africa People's Organization (SWAPO) party.

In the 2010 regional elections, SWAPO's Seblon Paulus won the constituency with 1,621 votes. His only challenger was Gabriel Jeremia of the Rally for Democracy and Progress (RDP) who received 19 votes. In the 2015 local and regional elections the SWAPO candidate won uncontested and became councillor after no opposition party nominated a candidate. For the 2020 regional election again no opposition candidate was fielded, and Timoteus Shoopa a Shivute, the SWAPO candidate, was duly elected.

References

Constituencies of Oshana Region
States and territories established in 1992
1992 establishments in Namibia